Sable River West, Nova Scotia  is a community in the Shelburne County, Nova Scotia, Canada.

General Service Areas in Nova Scotia
Communities in Shelburne County, Nova Scotia